The following television stations operate on virtual channel 54 in the United States:

 K11LP-D in Cortez, Colorado
 K21OC-D in Corpus Christi, Texas
 K31KW-D in Richland, Washington
 K48NK-D in Cortez, etc., Colorado
 KAJB in Calipatria, California
 KAZA-TV in Avalon, California
 KCEB in Longview, Texas
 KNVA in Austin, Texas
 KQEH in San Jose, California
 KUFS-LD in Fort Smith, Arkansas
 KVVG-LD in Porterville, California
 W13DI-D in Yauco, etc., Puerto Rico
 W16DX-D in Aguada, Puerto Rico
 WCCV-TV in Arecibo, Puerto Rico
 WCVN-TV in Covington, Kentucky
 WEYS-LD in Miami, Florida
 WFXG in Augusta, Georgia
 WJGP-LD in Kalamazoo, Michigan
 WNUV in Baltimore, Maryland
 WPXK-TV in Jellico, Tennessee
 WQLN in Erie, Pennsylvania
 WRTD-CD in Raleigh, North Carolina
 WTBY-TV in Poughkeepsie, New York
 WTLJ in Muskegon, Michigan
 WUPL in Slidell, Louisiana
 WXTX in Columbus, Georgia
 WZDX in Huntsville, Alabama

The following stations, which are no longer licensed, formerly operated on virtual channel 54:
 WEYS-LD in Miami, Florida

References

54 virtual